Esher Rugby Football Club is an English rugby union club based in Surrey, England. Esher currently play in the third division of the English league system; National League 1, following the club's promotion from National League 2 South at the end of the 2021–22 season.

History
The club was formed in 1923 when four rugby enthusiasts agreed to start a club.

When the league system was introduced in 1987 Esher were placed in London 1, but were relegated in the first season and did not win promotion back to that league until 1993.

Esher were first promoted to the national leagues system for the 1997–98 season, finishing fourth in National League 2 South. They led for most of the season the following year but finished second, but won promotion in 1999–00. The club set a new points record when winning National Division Two in 2006–07 and were thus promoted. They were promoted into the second tier, the RFU Championship after winning National League 1 in 2009–10. During this season they broke the world record when they beat Manchester 148 – 0. They played in the Championship for two seasons before being relegated back into National League 1 for the 2012–13 season.

In 2020, the club announced a 2-year agreement to share their ground with RFU Championship side London Scottish starting in 2021–22. However it was later confirmed that Scottish would remain at Richmond Athletic Ground.

Current standings

Honours
 Surrey Cup winners (8): 1976, 1977, 1978, 1979, 1994, 1996, 2011, 2012
 London Division 2 South champions: 1993–94
 London Division 1 champions: 1996–97 
 National League 2 South champions: 1999–00, 2021–22
 National League 1 (formerly National League 2) champions (2): 2006–07, 2009–10

Notable former players
  Neil Hallett - scored 1,301 points for Esher in all competitions between 2004–10 to become one of the most prolific points scorer in tier 3 history. Also capped by the Barbarians and England Counties XV as well as captaining Surrey.
  Ladislav Vondrasek - captain of the Czech Republic national team played for Esher between 2005–07.

References

External links
 Official site

English rugby union teams
Rugby clubs established in 1923
Rugby union clubs in Surrey
1923 establishments in England